Raindance is the debut solo album from English singer and musician Clark Datchler. It was released in 1990 by Virgin Records. Datchler had left Johnny Hates Jazz in 1988 to continue his solo career. He moved to Amsterdam and began work on his debut album.

Raindance features some renowned musicians, including bass player Nathan East, drummer John "JR" Robinson, percussionist Paulinho da Costa and guitarist Dave Gregory of XTC. The album saw the recording of Datchler's first environmental song, "Raindance". The first single from Raindance was "Crown of Thorns". It reached No. 100 in the UK and remains Datchler's only appearance on the chart as a solo artist. A music video was filmed to promote the single, which shows Clark singing along with other shots of art and relevant scenes relating to the lyrics featured in the song. Raindance was released shortly after but was a commercial failure. The Japanese version of the album features the bonus track "Widow", which was the B-side to "Crown of Thorns".
A selection of tracks were re-used for Datchler's following album Fishing for Souls, which did not see a release until 2010 where it appeared on iTunes. Some of the songs from the album were also used on a remixed version of The Last Emotion under the separate name Medicine Wheel, with Close to the Edge and Autumn Years on the track list as well. They were released on Virgin Records in the year 1992, around the same time that Fishing for Souls was finished.

Track listing

Singles
"Crown of Thorns"

"Raindance" Japan only

Personnel 
 Clark Datchler – vocals, keyboards, Synclavier strings (10), string arrangements (10)
 Simon Franglen – programming 
 Andy Richards – keyboards (1, 4), programming (7)
 Albert Boekholt – programming (1, 2, 3, 7, 10)
 Chuckii Booker – keyboards (4)
 Steve Piggot – keyboards (8)
 Richard Cottle – keyboards (9), programming (9)
 James Newton Howard – Synclavier strings (10), string arrangements (10)
 Paul Jackson Jr. – guitars (1, 4, 7, 9)
 Dave Gregory – guitars (2), acoustic guitar (8)
 Dann Huff – guitars (3, 6)
 James Harrah – guitars (5)
 J.J. Belle – guitars (7)
 Michael Landau – guitars (7, 9), acoustic guitar (10)
 Phil Palmer – electric guitar (8)
 Jay-Tee Teterissa – slap bass (1)
 Nathan East – bass (3), slap bass (7)
 Neil Stubenhaus – bass (8)
 Brian Rawling – drums (1, 6), percussion (10)
 John Robinson – drums (2-7)
 Geoff Dugmore – drums (8)
 Paulinho da Costa – percussion (1, 5-10)
 Rafael Padilla – percussion (1)
 Candy Dulfer – saxophone solo (1, 7)
 Larry Williams – clarinet (2)
 Jerry Hey – horn arrangements (1, 2, 7, 9)
 Jeremy Lubbock – string arrangements (8)
 Renée Geyer – backing vocals (1, 4, 6, 9)
 Simone Walraven – backing vocals (1, 5, 8)
 Ashley Datchler – backing vocals (4)

Production 
 Clark Datchler – producer 
 Humberto Gatica – producer, engineer 
 Nick Davis – engineer, mixing 
 Bob Kraushaar – engineer
 Chris Blair – mastering
 Simone Walraven – production assistant 
 Stylorouge – artwork
 Richard Haughton – photography

Studios
 Recorded at Olympic Studios, Sarm West Studios and CTS Studios (London, UK); The Manor Studio (Oxford, UK); Wisseloord Studios (Hilversum, Netherlands); Studio 150 (Amsterdam, Netherlands); Logic Studios (Milan, Italy); The Village Studios, Bunny Hop Studios, Lion Share Recording Studio and Record One (Los Angeles, California, USA); Sunset Sound (Hollywood, California, USA); Chartmaker Studios (Malibu, California, USA); Ground Control (Santa Monica, California, USA).
 Mastered at Abbey Road Studios (London, UK).

References

1990 debut albums
Virgin Records albums
Albums produced by Humberto Gatica